Red Lion Airport  is a private-use airport located  south of the central business district of the Vincentown section of Southampton Township, in Burlington County, New Jersey, United States. The airport is privately owned.

References

External links

Airports in New Jersey
Transportation in the Pine Barrens (New Jersey)
Southampton Township, New Jersey
Transportation buildings and structures in Burlington County, New Jersey